Brendon Michael Walsh (born July 27, 1978) is an American stand-up comedian and podcaster originally from Philadelphia.

Career

Walsh started performing stand-up comedy in Austin, Texas in 2002. He has appeared on The Price Is Right, Premium Blend, Jimmy Kimmel Live!, Conan, Last Comic Standing, in sketches on the G4 network, @midnight, and The Bob & Tom Show. He toured from 2005 to 2008 as the opening act for Doug Stanhope.

Walsh has performed at the Vancouver Comedy Festival; Just for Laughs in Montreal; South by Southwest (SXSW); the first annual Bentzen Ball in Washington, D.C.; the Fun Fun Fun Fest in Austin, Texas; the Bridgetown Comedy Festival in Portland, Oregon; and the Aspen Comedy Festival. In 2007, he won the $10,000 grand prize on the comedy stage at Famecast.com. In 2008, he was named one of the "Top 9: Emerging Comedians" on AskMen.com.

On March 12, 2010, Walsh performed at A Night of 140 Tweets, a benefit for Haiti at the Upright Citizens Brigade Theatre in Los Angeles. In 2011, he appeared on WTF with Marc Maron and The Joe Rogan Experience. He previously co-hosted a podcast, The Bone Zone, with Randy Liedtke, and Do You Know Who Jason Segel Is? podcast with Nick Thune on the All Things Comedy network. He currently hosts The World Record Podcast, wherein each week he and a guest analyze a different world record. Guests have included Melissa Villaseñor, Josh Gad, Lin-Manuel Miranda, Christopher Nolan, Jared Fogle, Michael Keaton, Tom Brady and Dwayne "The Rock" Johnson. Ted Danson also appeared on the show to discuss his pursuit to break a bowling world record. In December 2020, he interviewed veteran celebrity traspo captain Dicker Troy.

References

External links
Brendon Walsh website

Living people
1973 births
Place of birth missing (living people)
American stand-up comedians
Comedians from Pennsylvania
People from Philadelphia
21st-century American comedians